A Scottish regiment is any regiment (or similar military unit) that at some time in its history has or had a name that referred to Scotland or some part thereof, and adopted items of Scottish dress. These regiments were created after the Acts of Union in 1707 between England and Scotland, either directly serving Britain during its various wars, or as part of the military establishments of Commonwealth countries. Their "Scottishness" is no longer necessarily due to recruitment in Scotland nor any proportion of members of Scottish ancestry.

Traditionally, Scottish regiments cultivate a reputation of exceptional fierceness in combat and are often given romantic portrayals in popular media. Within Scotland itself, regiments of the Scottish Lowlands did not adopt as distinctively "Scottish" (specifically Scottish Highland) uniforms until the late Victorian Era and even then the kilt, that most distinctive aspect of the Highland soldier, was not adopted wholesale.

History

Lowland regiments
These generally predate the more widely known Highland regiments (see below). The senior Lowland regiment was the Royal Scots (the Royal Regiment) which dates from 1633. The Royal Scots Fusiliers and the King's Own Scottish Borderers were subsequently raised in 1678 and 1689 respectively. Throughout the 17th, 18th and most of the 19th centuries these Scottish regiments served widely and with distinction. They did not however differ significantly in appearance or public perception from the bulk of the line infantry of the British Army. In 1881 the introduction of the Cardwell system of reforms provided the opportunity to adopt a modified form of Scottish dress for the Lowland regiments. Comprising doublets and tartan trews this gave the Lowlanders a distinctive identity, separate from their English, Welsh, Irish and Highland counterparts. At the same time, the absence of kilts (except for pipers) and the substitution of Kilmarnock bonnets for feather bonnets prevented confusion between Lowlanders and their Highland counterparts.  The Cameronians (Scottish Rifles) was created at the same time from the merging of two existing numbered regiments.

Highland regiments

The original Highland regiments were raised in the 18th century with the object of recruiting rank and file solely from the Scottish Highlands. However, due to the Highlands becoming extensively depopulated through the course of the 19th and 20th centuries, the Highland regiments of the British Army have witnessed a long-term decline in the proportion of recruits from the Highlands and have long recruited many Lowland Scots and others. The major 20th century exceptions to this rule were the First and Second World Wars, when many Highland men joined up. Around the time that the first Highland regiments were raised the Highlands had recently been a hotbed for several revolts against the establishment, namely the Jacobite Rebellions, so the loyalties of the Highlanders were often deemed suspect in the early history of the Highland regiments.

The first Highland regiment, the Black Watch was originally raised from clans openly loyal to the status quo in order for the government to better police the Highlands, which were deemed to be both rebellious and lawless by the contemporary British establishment. However, due to a pressing need for personnel in North America during the Seven Years' War, William Pitt the Elder made the decision to raise new Highland regiments to fight in this global conflict. The war ended in victory and among other things, Canada was secured as a part of the British Empire, while the British East India Company's position in India was consolidated and expanded, both at the expense of the French. These Highland regiments were disbanded after the war, but other Highland regiments were raised later and, like the rest of the British Army, saw service in various wars including in the Napoleonic Wars.

By the Victorian era the loyalty of the Highlanders was no longer suspect. Queen Victoria had a personal interest in things Scottish, in particular relating to the Highlands. In addition Highland regiments had played a conspicuous role in such Victorian conflicts as the Crimean War and the putting down of the Indian Mutiny. The Highland regiments earned a reputation which influenced the mindset of those Scottish regiments which were Lowland in origin. This resulted in the wearing of tartan by Lowland regiments which had previously worn uniforms not clearly distinguishable from their Irish, Welsh and English counterparts. In the case of the Highland Light Infantry, the distinction between Highlanders and Lowlanders was slightly blurred: although classified as a non-kilted Highland regiment it was recruited from Glasgow in Lowland Scotland and bore the title of "City of Glasgow Regiment".

Scottish bagpipes have been adopted in a number of countries, largely in imitation of the pipers of Highland regiments which served throughout the British Empire. Highland regiments were raised in a number of Commonwealth armies, often adopting formal honorary affiliations with Scottish regiments of the British Army.

Scottish regiments in the United Kingdom

Current regiments in the British Army

Royal Scots Dragoon Guards
Scots Guards
Royal Regiment of Scotland
19th Regiment Royal Artillery
105th Regiment Royal Artillery
32 Signal Regiment
154 (Scottish) Regiment RLC
G (Messines) Company, London Guards (currently the reserve company of the Scots Guards)
51st Highland Volunteers
52nd Lowland Volunteers

Additionally, the British Army also operate the Scottish and North Irish Yeomanry, consisting of:

A (Ayrshire (Earl of Carrick's Own) Yeomanry) Squadron in Ayr
B (North Irish Horse) Squadron in Belfast and Coleraine
C (Fife and Forfar Yeomanry/Scottish Horse) Squadron in Cupar
E (Lothians and Border Yeomanry) Squadron in Edinburgh

Former regiments in the British Army

The following units were formerly a part of the British Army's Highland Brigade. The brigade was amalgamated into the Scottish Division in 1968.

The Black Watch (Royal Highland Regiment) (1725–2006)
The Highland Light Infantry (City of Glasgow Regiment) (1881–1959)
The Seaforth Highlanders (Ross-shire Buffs, The Duke of Albany's) (1881–1961)
The Gordon Highlanders (1881–1994)
The Queen's Own Cameron Highlanders (1793–1961)
The Argyll and Sutherland Highlanders (Princess Louise's) (1881–2006)
The Highlanders (Seaforth, Gordons and Camerons) (1994–2006)

The following units were formerly a part of the British Army's Lowland Brigade. The brigade was amalgamated into the Scottish Division in 1968.

The Royal Scots (The Royal Regiment) (1633–2006)
The Royal Scots Fusiliers (1678–1959)
The King's Own Scottish Borderers (1689–2006)
The Cameronians (Scottish Rifles) (1881–1968)

Former yeomanry of Scotland includes:

Ayrshire (Earl of Carrick's Own) Yeomanry
Lothians and Border Horse
Lanarkshire Yeomanry
Queen's Own Royal Glasgow Yeomanry
Fife and Forfar Yeomanry
Lovat Scouts
Scottish Horse
Fife and Forfar Yeomanry/Scottish Horse
Queen's Own Lowland Yeomanry
Scottish Yeomanry

Private regiment
The Atholl Highlanders is a ceremonial Scottish regiment which not part of the British Army but under the command of the Duke of Atholl, based at Blair Castle. It was presented with colours by Queen Victoria in 1844, giving the regiment official status. It is the only legal private army in Europe.

Scottish regiments in other armies

Australia

Current regiments

There are presently five Scottish 'Kilted Companies' in the Australian Army Reserve. They include:
 A Company, 2nd/17th Battalion, Royal New South Wales Regiment (Black Watch)
 B Company, 5th/6th Battalion, Royal Victoria Regiment (Gordon Highlanders)
 A Company, 10th/27th Battalion, Royal South Australia Regiment (Mackenzie Seaforth Highlanders)
 B Company, 16th Battalion, Royal Western Australia Regiment (Cameron Highlanders)
 B Company, 41st Battalion, Royal New South Wales Regiment (Argyle and Sutherland Highlanders)

Former regiments
30th Battalion (The New South Wales Scottish Regiment) (1915–1919; 1921–1930; 1935–1946; 1948–1960)
61st Battalion (The Queensland Cameron Highlanders). (1938–1946)

British India

Auxiliary Force (India) (1920-1947) 

 The Calcutta Scottish (1914-1947)

Canada

Current regiments 

There are 16 Canadian-Scottish infantry regiments, and one Canadian-Scottish artillery regiment in Canada's Primary Reserve. The Black Watch (Royal Highland Regiment) of Canada is the senior Canadian-Scottish infantry regiment of the Canadian Army.

Canadian-Scottish regiments in the Canadian Army Reserve:

 42nd Field Artillery Regiment (Lanark and Renfrew Scottish), RCA
 48th Highlanders of Canada
 The Argyll and Sutherland Highlanders of Canada (Princess Louise's)
 The Black Watch (Royal Highland Regiment) of Canada
 The Calgary Highlanders
 The Cameron Highlanders of Ottawa (Duke of Edinburgh's Own)
 The Canadian Scottish Regiment (Princess Mary's)
 The Essex and Kent Scottish
 The Lake Superior Scottish Regiment
 The Lorne Scots (Peel, Dufferin and Halton Regiment)
 The Cape Breton Highlanders
 The Nova Scotia Highlanders
 The Queen's Own Cameron Highlanders of Canada
 The Royal Highland Fusiliers of Canada
 The Seaforth Highlanders of Canada
 The Stormont, Dundas and Glengarry Highlanders
 The Toronto Scottish Regiment (Queen Elizabeth The Queen Mother's Own)

Supplementary Order of Battle
 The Perth Regiment (1866–1965)

Former regiments 

 13th Scottish Light Dragoons (1866- 1936)
 The Argyll Light Infantry (1863-1954)
The Lorne Rifles (Scottish) (1866-1936)
 The Essex Scottish Regiment (1885-1954)
 The Highland Light Infantry of Canada (1886–1954, 1957–1965)
 The Lanark and Renfrew Scottish Regiment (1866-1946, 1959-1992)
50th Regiment (Gordon Highlanders of Canada) (1913-1920)
 The New Brunswick Scottish (1946-1954)
The Pictou Highlanders (1871- 1954)
 The North Nova Scotia Highlanders (1936–1954)
 The Prince Edward Island Highlanders (1875–1946)
 The Cumberland Highlanders (1871-1936)
 The Scots Fusiliers of Canada (1914 - 1965)

New Zealand
The New Zealand Army formerly operated a Scottish regiment, the New Zealand Scottish Regiment. Initially raised as an infantry regiment in January 1939, it was later converted into an armoured unit of the Royal New Zealand Armoured Corps. The unit was formally disbanded on 16 April 2016.

South Africa

Current regiments 
The South African Army has maintained several Scottish regiments with the South African Army Infantry Formation. All regiments are reserve units of the South African Army. In 2019, a number of reserve units, including the Scottish regiments, were renamed in an effort to better reflect "the military traditions and history of indigenous African military formations". These regiments include:

 Chief Makhanda Regiment (First City Regiment)
 Gonnema Regiment (Cape Town Highlanders Regiment)
 Solomon Mahlangu Regiment (Transvaal Scottish Regiment)
 Bambatha Rifles (Witwatersrand Rifles)

Former regiments 

 Pretoria Highlanders (1939-2017)

United States

The United States Army (or the Union Army during the American Civil War) formerly operated two Scottish regiments. One of these regiments operated as a part of the New York State Militia prior to the American Civil War. Scottish regiments formerly maintained by the United States Army includes:
 12th Illinois Infantry Regiment (1861–1865)
 79th New York Volunteer Infantry (1858–1876)

See also
 Military of Scotland
 Garde Écossaise

References

 Barnes, RM, The Uniforms and History of the Scottish Regiments, London, Sphere Books Limited, 1972.

External links
 Quick Guide to Scottish Regiments
 Royal Regiment of Scotland | Scottish Military Heritage Centre

Highland regiments
Military of Scotland
Infantry